Meta Golding is a Haitian-American actress.

Life and career
Golding was born in Port-au-Prince, Haiti. She was raised in several countries. Besides the United States, Golding also lived in India, Haiti, France and Italy. During her years in Italy, she competed on ice as an Italian national figure skater, but when an injury ended her skating career she started acting in Italian theater. She returned to the U.S to attend Cornell University and earned degrees in Theatre Arts and International Relations.

Golding played District 2 tribute Enobaria in The Hunger Games: Catching Fire and The Hunger Games: Mockingjay – Part 2.

She also guest starred in Criminal Minds temporarily replacing A. J. Cook, and played villainous Selina in an episode of Burn Notice.

Golding currently resides in Los Angeles, California. She is fluent in English, French, Haitian Creole and Italian.

Filmography

References

External links

Meta Golding at TV Guide

20th-century American actresses
21st-century American actresses
American film actresses
Haitian emigrants to the United States
American television actresses
Cornell University alumni
Living people
American expatriates in Italy
Year of birth missing (living people)